Igi or IGI may refer to:

Organisations
 Industrial and General Insurance Company, based in Nigeria with subsidiaries in Uganda and Rwanda
 Innovative Genomics Institute, founded by Jennifer Doudna
 International Gemological Institute, a diamond grading laboratory
 University of International Golden Indonesia (Universitas IGI)

Other uses 
 Igi (short story), 1977, by Georgian author Jemal Karchkhadze
 Igi, one of the Asia Islands of Indonesia
 Igi, a Samoan slack-key guitar tuning
 IGI, or 𒅆, a cuneiform sign
 Indira Gandhi International Airport, Delhi
 Instrument Ground Instructor, a United States aviation license
 Interconnector Greece – Italy, a planned natural gas pipeline
 International Genealogical Index
 Project I.G.I., a tactical shooter computer game
 I.G.I.-2: Covert Strike, its sequel

See also 
 Iggy
 IGY (disambiguation)